In the Stone House is a collection of science fiction, fantasy and horror stories by American writer  Barry N. Malzberg.  It was released in 2000 and was the author's first book published by Arkham House.  It was published in an edition of approximately 2,500 copies.  The stories originally appeared in The Magazine of Fantasy and Science Fiction, Omni, Science Fiction Age and other magazines.

Contents

In the Stone House contains the following tales:

 "Heavy Metal"
 "Turpentine"
 "Quartermain"
 "The Prince of the Steppes"
 "Andante Lugubre"
 "Standards & Practices"
 "Darwinian Facts"
 "Allegro Marcato"
 "Something from the Seventies"
 "The High Purpose"
 "All Assassins"
 "Understanding Entropy"
 "Ship Full of Jews"
 "Amos"
 "Improvident Excess"
 "Hitler At Nuremberg"
 "Concerto Accademico"
 "The Intransigents"
 "Hieractic Realignment"
 "The Only Thing You Learn"
 "Police Actions"
 "Fugato"
 "Major League Triceratops"
 "In the Stone House"

See also 
Barry N. Malzberg bibliography

Sources

External links 
 

2000 short story collections
Fantasy short story collections
Horror short story collections
Science fiction short story collections
Arkham House books